Lytechinus semituberculatus, commonly known as the green hedgehog or green sea urchin, is a sea urchin found in the coast of the Galapagos Islands. It is recognizable by its green coloration. Its conservation status is unknown.

Gallery

References 

Lytechinus
Echinoidea genera
Animals described in 1846